Renaissance Center station is a Detroit People Mover station in Downtown Detroit, Michigan.  It is located at the northeast corner of  the Renaissance Center complex (whence the station takes its name), connected to Tower 200 (Northwest) at Level 2 alongside Jefferson Avenue.  As it serves RenCen, the station serves the Marriott Hotel, General Motors headquarters, the Riverfront and the Wintergarden shopping center.  In 2014, this stop was the second most heavily trafficked (behind only Greektown) with 487,758 riders.

The People Mover shut down temporarily on March 30, 2020, due to decreased ridership amid the COVID-19 pandemic. Following the system's May 2022 restart, the station reopened on September 14, 2022.

See also

 List of rapid transit systems
 List of United States rapid transit systems by ridership
 Metromover
 Transportation in metropolitan Detroit

References

External links
 DPM station overview
entrance from Google Maps Street View

Detroit People Mover stations
Railway stations in the United States opened in 1987
1987 establishments in Michigan